FCAN (Flash Crowds Alleviation Network) is an adaptive Content Delivery Network that dynamically optimizes the system structure between peer-to-peer (P2P) and client–server configurations as a possible way to alleviate flash crowds effect.

FCAN constructs P2P overlay on cache proxy layer to distribute the flash traffic from origin web server. It uses policy-configured DNS redirection to route the client requests in balance, and adopts strategy load detection to monitor and react the load changes.

While FCAN has been the subject of some research, there are no widespread deployments.

Publications

 Chenyu Pan, Merdan Atajanov, Toshihiko Shimokawa, and Norihiko Yoshida, "Design of Adaptive Network against Flash Crowds", IPSJ/IEICE Information Technology Letters, Vol.3, pp. 323–326 (September, 2004)
 Chenyu Pan, Merdan Atajanov, Mohammad Belayet Hossain, Toshihiko Shimokawa, and Norihiko Yoshida, "FCAN: Flash Crowds Alleviation Network Using Adaptive P2P Overlay of Cache Proxies", IEICE Transactions on Communications, Vol.E89-B, No.4, pp. 1119–1126 (April, 2006)
 Merdan Atajanov, Chenyu Pan, Toshihiko Shimokawa, and Norihiko Yoshida, "Scalable Cloud of Cache Proxies for Flash Crowds Alleviation Network", International Transactions on Communication and Signal Processing, Vol.8, No.1, pp. 59–70 (August, 2006)
 Merdan Atajanov, Toshihiko Shimokawa, and Norihiko Yoshida, "Autonomic Multi-Server Distribution in Flash Crowds Alleviation Network", Lecture Notes in Computer Science, Springer (Proceedings of IFIP 3rd International Symposium on Network Centric Ubiquitous Systems, Taipei, Taiwan), accepted (December, 2007)

External links
 TENBIN
 Yoshida LAB

Applications of distributed computing